Off the Couch with Ethan is an Australian travel television program, produced and presented by student Ethan White. The program is aimed at teenagers and their families, and presents Australian landmarks, towns and points of interest. It airs on C31 Melbourne & Geelong and Channel 44 Adelaide. Episodes are directed at high-school-aged students and their families.

History 
White was born in Adelaide, South Australia and resides in the town of Gawler, 40 kilometres north of Adelaide.  He has been interested in filmmaking since his childhood, and frequently camping his family at locations in South Australia, where he made family holiday videos.

In November 2017, at the age of 15, White contacted Channel 44 Adelaide, a community television station that broadcasts to the Greater Adelaide region. He proposed an idea for a travel-themed television program that encourages young people to get outdoors with their families, and secured a program slot with the title "Off the Couch with Ethan." In April 2018, filming for the first episode took place in the Southern Flinders Ranges in South Australia. The episode was broadcast on Saturday 23 June 2018 on Channel 44 Adelaide.

New episodes of the program continue to be broadcast on Channel 44 Adelaide, as well as C31 Melbourne & Geelong, which began broadcasting the program in early 2019.

A second season of the program was announced in November 2021, and is due to commence broadcasting in May 2022.

Episodes

Season 1 (2018–21)

Season 2 (2022)

Specials

Awards 
In January 2019, White was named a joint winner of the Town of Gawler Young Citizen of the Year for outstanding efforts and contribution to the community.

In October 2019, White and Off the Couch with Ethan were nominated for five categories at the 2019 Antenna Awards: Best Outdoor or Recreational Program, Best Youth Program, Youth Personality of the Year, Personality of the Year and Program of the Year.

White and the program were again nominated for four categories at the 2021 Antenna Awards, including Best Outdoor or Recreational Program, Best Youth Program, Best Youth Personality and Personality of the Year. In September 2021, Off the Couch with Ethan won the Antenna Award for Best Outdoor or Recreational Program.

In January 2022, White was awarded the Town of Gawler Young Citizen of the Year for 2022, for his efforts in community contribution, including charity work, promotion of the community and assisting the youth of Gawler.

See also
Community television in Australia

References

External links

2018 Australian television series debuts
Australian travel television series
Australian community access television shows
English-language television shows